Edinburgh University Association Football Club are a football club representing the University of Edinburgh. Established in 1878, they are third oldest club in East of Scotland football and have been a member of the Scottish Football Association (SFA) since that year. Edinburgh University are eligible to compete in the Scottish Cup every season as they are full members of the SFA. The club's present home is at Peffermill, where it has played since its move from Canal Field in 1978.

History 

A group describing itself as "The Edinburgh University Foot Ball Club" played three matches in 1851.  On the 25th of January, it played against the 93rd regiment, awarding medals to the winning team of the Regiment.  No further activity by the club was documented for over a decade.

The Club won its first trophy, the Edinburgh Shield in 1883. Historically it is the most successful footballing university in Scotland. The club has won the Edinburgh Shield once, the Queen's Park Shield 26 times (including eight successive wins from 1973–74 to 1981–82),the East of Scotland Amateur Cup once, the Scottish Qualifying Cup (South) once, the East of Scotland Qualifying Cup three times, the British University Sports Association (BUSA) Cup once and the King Cup three times.

The most recent achievements of the club include winning the East of Scotland Qualifying Cup in 2005, and finishing in second position in the East of Scotland Premier Division in 2007–08. In October 2006, the side beat Vale of Leithen 3–0 to reach the first round proper of the Scottish Cup for the first time since 1972–73. In November 2006, they defeated Keith to proceed to the second round of the Scottish Cup for only the second time in the club's history, and 106 years after their first appearance at this stage. The team's 2006 cup run was halted by Cowdenbeath, who defeated the university 5–1 at Central Park on 9 December 2006. After the Scottish Qualifying Cup was abolished, Edinburgh University gained direct entry to the Scottish Cup as a full member of the SFA. Receiving a random bye in the first round, Edinburgh University beat Deveronvale in the second round before losing to Cove Rangers in the third round.

The club was admitted to the Lowland Football League for the 2014–15 season. Their best finishing position is 6th place in 2015–16.

Dorian Ogunro, a former Edinburgh University 1st XI player returned to coach the Under 21 Team after graduating and has been the Uni's head coach since being appointed in 2013.

Season-by-season record

Lowland League

† Season curtailed due to coronavirus pandemic.

Honours
East of Scotland Football League
Runners-up: 1974–75, 2007–08
East of Scotland Football League First Division
Runners-up: 2000–01
King Cup
Winners: 1976–77, 2006–07, 2013–14
East of Scotland Shield
Winners: 1882–83

See also
Edinburgh University Hutchison Vale F.C., women's team run in conjunction with Lothian Thistle Hutchison Vale F.C.

References

External links
 Edinburgh University AFC

Association football clubs established in 1878
Clubs and societies of the University of Edinburgh
Football clubs in Edinburgh
University and college football clubs in Scotland
1878 establishments in Scotland
East of Scotland Football League teams
Lowland Football League teams